Benjamin Lewis may refer to:
Benjamin Lewis (canoeist) (born 1982), American canoeist
Benjamin Lewis (footballer) (1869–?), Welsh footballer
Benjamin F. Lewis (1909–1963), American politician, alderman from Chicago, Illinois
Benjamin Alec Lewis (1912–?), Archdeacon of St Davids
Benjamin Lewis, co-chairman of Triumph Films

See also

Ben Lewis (disambiguation)